The 1987 Grand Prix de Strasbourg was a women's tennis tournament played on outdoor clay courts in Strasbourg, France, and was part of the Category 1+ tier of the 1987 Virginia Slims World Championship Series. It was the inaugural edition of the tournament and was held from 18 May until 24 May 1987. Fourth-seeded Carling Bassett won the singles title.

Finals

Singles
 Carling Bassett defeated  Sandra Cecchini 6–3, 6–4
 It was Bassett's 1st title of the year and the 2nd of her career.

Doubles
 Jana Novotná /  Catherine Suire defeated  Kathleen Horvath /  Marcella Mesker 6–0, 6–2

References

External links
 Official website 
 ITF tournament edition details 
 Tournament draws

Internationaux de Strasbourg
1987
Internationaux de Strasbourg
May 1987 sports events in Europe
1987 in French women's sport